Langebaek may refer to:
 Langebæk, a small village in southern Denmark
 Carl Henrik Langebaek, Colombian anthropologist and Muisca scholar